Romain is a commune in the Marne department in north-eastern France.

The village was destroyed during World War I and was awarded the Croix de guerre 1914–1918 (France) on May 30, 1921.

See also
Communes of the Marne department

References

Communes of Marne (department)